Regina Halmich (born 22 November 1976) is a German professional boxer. She is among the most successful female boxers of all time and helped popularise female boxing in Europe.

Amateur career
Halmich was German champion in kickboxing as an amateur in 1992, 1993 and 1994, a year in which she also earned the European title.

Professional career
As a professional, she has boxed in the Jr. Flyweight, Flyweight, Jr. Bantamweight, Bantamweight and Featherweight divisions. Halmich was  the WIBF's world champion in the Jr. Flyweight, Flyweight and Super Flyweight divisions. Halmich made her professional debut on 4 March 1994, in her hometown of Karlsruhe, defeating Fienie Klee of the Netherlands.

Regina Halmich has defeated several quality boxers during her career. She defended her Flyweight title with success against Delia Gonzalez, Yvonne Caples, Johanna Peña-Álvarez and numerous others, once only with a draw against Elena Reid. She also faced Daisy Lang, against whom she won in a fight for the vacant IWBF world Super Flyweight title.

On 15 January 2005, she defeated Marylin Hernandez by a ten-round unanimous decision defending the world Flyweight title. On 16 April 2005 she also defeated Hollie Dunaway in ten rounds defending her title. In her 50th professional fight, she defended the title against María Jesús Rosa Reina from Spain. She held the title for more than ten years. In December 2005 she won the rematch against Elena Reid.

On 9 September 2006, Halmich won her 53rd pro fight, defeating Ria Ramnarine of Trinidad and Tobago by TKO in the sixth round. Her pro boxing record now stands at 52 wins, 1 loss and 1 draw.

Halmich faced Reka Krempf of Hungary on 13 January 2007 at the Brandberg Arena in Halle (Saale), defeating her by a unanimous decision for the 44th successful title defense.

Retirement
Halmich announced her retirement after her farewell fight on 30 November 2007, in which she beat Hagar Finer of Israel by majority decision (96–94, 97–94, 95–95).

Outside the ring

In addition to her boxing career, Halmich has branched out into the world of business, as she became one of the first women boxers to have her own line of cosmetics. She has posed as a model for some German magazines and websites. 
Halmich became famous on German television with a promotional fight against German TV host Stefan Raab, in his show TV total in March 2001. The fight was rather chaotic, the referee intended to end it more than once because he felt that Stefan Raab's health was in danger, but show host Raab kept convincing him to continue the fight. Although Halmich broke Stefan Raab's nose during the fight, he at least managed to go the distance with her. A second fight between these two took place in 2007, and Halmich won again.

The EP "All We Are – The Fight" by metal band Warlock is subtitled "A Tribute to Regina Halmich", because this version of the title track "All We Are" was originally performed on 30 March 2006 on German TV as the entrance song for Regina Halmich, who was also Doro's best friend.

International recognition
She is not a stranger to American boxing fans, and, in 1996, American boxing publication Ring Magazine published the first of a number of articles about her in that magazine. In 2016 January Ring magazine considered the 2nd best female boxer of all time.

Professional boxing record

References

External links

 Official website 
 
 News and Pictures of Regina Halmich

1976 births
Living people
Sportspeople from Karlsruhe
German women boxers
World boxing champions
Flyweight boxers
Recipients of the Order of Merit of Baden-Württemberg